The 1987 Hamilton Tiger-Cats season was the 30th season for the team in the Canadian Football League and their 38th overall. The Tiger-Cats finished in 3rd place in the East Division with a 7–11 record and lost the East Semi-Final to the Toronto Argonauts. Steve Stapler set a franchise record (broken in 1989) for most touchdowns in one season with 13.

Preseason

Regular season

Season standings

Season schedule

Postseason

Schedule

Awards and honours
Harold Ballard was elected into the Canadian Football Hall of Fame as a Builder, May 2, 1987.
Angelo Mosca was elected into the Canadian Football Hall of Fame as a player on, May 2, 1987. He played 15 CFL seasons, including nine times in the Grey Cup Game (emerging a winner five times). A CFL All-Star in 1963 and 1970, he was an Eastern All-Star Defensive Tackle five times.

1987 CFL All-Stars
DT – Mike Walker

References

Hamilton Tiger-Cats seasons
1987 Canadian Football League season by team